Richard Csejtey (born 25 July 1979) is a Slovak para table tennis player who was born with cerebral palsy. He has competed in five consecutive Paralympic Games and has won multiple medals in both world and European para table tennis championships.

References

External links
 

1979 births
Living people
Paralympic table tennis players of Slovakia
Paralympic silver medalists for Slovakia
Paralympic bronze medalists for Slovakia
Paralympic medalists in table tennis
Medalists at the 2000 Summer Paralympics
Table tennis players at the 2000 Summer Paralympics
Medalists at the 2004 Summer Paralympics
Table tennis players at the 2004 Summer Paralympics
Medalists at the 2008 Summer Paralympics
Table tennis players at the 2008 Summer Paralympics
Medalists at the 2012 Summer Paralympics
Table tennis players at the 2012 Summer Paralympics
Sportspeople from Dunajská Streda
Slovak male table tennis players